Ascoleucetta is a genus of sponges in the family Leucascidae, first described in 1924 by Arthur Dendy and Leslie M. Frederick.

Species
According to WORMS, accepted species in the genus are:
Ascoleucetta compressa 
Ascoleucetta ventricosa 
Species previously in this genus are:
Ascoleucetta amitsba  accepted as Bidderia amitsba 
Ascoleucetta sagittata  accepted as Leucetta chagosensis 
Ascoleucetta soyo  accepted as Leucettusa soyo

References

Taxa named by Ernst Haeckel